Firewater may refer to:

Liquid
 High-proof beverages, particularly illegal moonshine
 Firewater (fire fighting), the polluted water remaining after fire fighting
 Fire water, water stored in tanks for wildfire suppression

Art and Entertainment
 Firewater (band), a US indie rock group founded by Tod A. in 1995
 Firewater (film), Hardi Volmer's Estonian history-based thriller
 Firewater (Tha Alkaholiks album), 2006
 Firewater (Silkworm album), 1996
 Firewater (Whiskey Myers album), 2011
 Firewater Studios, digital recording studio

See also
 Fire and Water (disambiguation)
 Firewater myths